Xocolatlite is a sulfate mineral named for its chocolatey appearance. Discovered in the La Bambolla gold mine of Moctezuma, Sonora, Mexico, Xocolatlite's name is derived from the Nahuatl word xocolatl (literally "bitter water"; a root word of "chocolate"), a drink made from cocoa, water, and chili.

References

Sulfate minerals
Monoclinic minerals
Minerals in space group 10